Agelasta marmorata is a species of beetle in the family Cerambycidae. It was described by Pic in 1927. It is known from Laos, China and Vietnam.

References

marmorata
Beetles described in 1927